Marina Evgenevna Trandenkova (born 7 January 1967) is a Russian athlete who competed mainly in the 100 metres.

She competed for the Unified Team at the 1992 Summer Olympics held in Barcelona, Spain in the 4 x 100 metres where she won the silver medal with her teammates Olga Bogoslovskaya, Galina Malchugina and Irina Privalova. She was reprimanded in 1996 after testing positive for Bromantane. She is married to the former pole vaulter Igor Trandenkov.

See also
List of doping cases in athletics

References

External links

 profile

1967 births
Living people
Russian female sprinters
Olympic athletes of Russia
Olympic athletes of the Unified Team
Olympic silver medalists for the Unified Team
Olympic silver medalists in athletics (track and field)
Athletes (track and field) at the 1992 Summer Olympics
Athletes (track and field) at the 1996 Summer Olympics
Athletes (track and field) at the 2000 Summer Olympics
Medalists at the 1992 Summer Olympics
World Athletics Championships athletes for Russia
World Athletics Championships winners
European Athletics Championships medalists
Russian Athletics Championships winners
Doping cases in athletics
Russian sportspeople in doping cases
Olympic female sprinters